Hantangang Station was a railway station on the Gyeongwon Line in South Korea.

This station was closed on April 1, 2019, when an extension of Seoul Subway Line 1 to Yeoncheon Station began construction.

Railway stations in Gyeonggi Province